Nehemiah Fernandez-Veliz (born 11 December 2004) is a French professional footballer who plays for Paris Saint-Germain.

Club career 
Born in Stains, Seine-Saint-Denis, Nehemiah Fernandez-Veliz moved to the Paris Saint-Germain Academy in September 2016, from Sarcelles.

He signed his professional contract with the club on 2 June 2022, as he had already trained with Mauricio Pochettino's first team.

During the 2021–22 and 2022–23 seasons he became a key member of the under-19 team, playing in the UEFA Youth League.

He first appeared on the team sheet in Ligue 1 on 19 March 2023, being selected by Christophe Galtier for the home game against Stade Rennais.

International career 
Fernandez-Veliz is a youth international for France, having first played for the under-16, Lionel Rouxel awarding him his debut in September 2019, during a friendly against Wales.

He played his first and only game with France under-18s on the 26 March 2022, starting in the 2–1 friendly win against the Netherlands, before stepping up to the under-19.

Style of play 
Fernandez-Veliz is described as a technically gifted ball-playing central defender, good at winning duels, and not bothered by their physicality.

References

External links

2004 births
Living people
French footballers
France youth international footballers
Association football defenders
Sportspeople from Seine-Saint-Denis